John Lambie was a Scottish engineer.  He was born in Saltcoats, Ayrshire, on 29 October 1833 and died in Glasgow on 1 February 1895. He was Locomotive Superintendent of the Caledonian Railway from 1891 to 1895.

Career
John Lambie became Locomotive Superintendent of the Caledonian Railway on 1 April 1891. He came from a railway background as his father had been Traffic Manager of the Wishaw and Coltness Railway until it was absorbed by the Caledonian Railway in 1848.

Innovations
John Lambie improved conditions for enginemen by fitting cab doors, better handrails and footsteps to locomotives. He improved on Dugald Drummond's 4-4-0 design in 1894 and he introduced condensing steam locomotives of the 4-4-0T and 0-4-4T types for underground lines.

See also
 Locomotives of the Caledonian Railway
 Locomotives of the London, Midland and Scottish Railway

References

1833 births
1895 deaths
British railway pioneers
Scottish railway mechanical engineers
People from Saltcoats
Caledonian Railway people
Locomotive builders and designers
19th-century British businesspeople